"A Toz" is a humorous French novelty rap song by the duo Farid & Oussama featuring Aymane Serhani. The song is bilingual in French and North African Arabic dialect. Farid & Oussama is a comics duo with a number of releases online and is made up of Farid Ben Salah and Oussama El Fatmi.

The track "A Toz" gained huge popularity online and was released as a single in February 2015 on Juston Records / Musicast reaching number 12 on SNEP, the French Official Singles Chart and reaching the Top 20 on Ultratop Wallonia, the Official French Belgian (Wallonia) Music Charts.

Track listing
"A Toz" (Farid & Oussama feat. Aymane Serhani) - 2:58

Charts

References

2015 singles
2014 songs